Wall Independent School District is a public school district based in the community of Wall, Texas (USA).

Wall ISD has three campuses
Wall High (Grades 9-12)
Wall Middle (Grades 6-8)
Wall Elementary (Grades PK-5)

In 2009, the school district was rated "recognized" by the Texas Education Agency.

References

External links
Wall ISD
Teaching in Wall ISD

School districts in Tom Green County, Texas
School districts in San Angelo, Texas